An airdrop is an unsolicited distribution of a cryptocurrency token or coin, usually for free, to numerous wallet addresses. Airdrops are often associated with the launch of a new cryptocurrency or a DeFi protocol, primarily as a way of gaining attention and new followers, resulting in a larger user base and a wider disbursement of coins. Airdrops have been a more important part of ICOs since crypto entrepreneurs have started doing private sales instead of public offerings to raise initial capital. One example of this is by the company Omise, which gave away five percent of its OmiseGO cryptocurrency to Ethereum holders in September 2017.

Airdrops are also often used by companies, brands and entrepreneurs to reward their current holders, investors and collectors, which may receive tokens, coins or assets for free, based on how much they invested or contributed to a certain project.

Airdrops aim to take advantage of the network effect by engaging existing holders of a particular blockchain-based currency, such as Bitcoin or Ethereum in their currency or project.

In the United States, the practice has raised policy issues about tax liability and whether they amount to income or capital gains.

A dusting attack is one important risk of crypto airdrops to take into consideration.

References 

Cryptocurrencies
 Financial technology